Gustavo Oliveros (born 18 June 1946) is a Cuban fencer. He competed in the individual and team épée events at the 1968 Summer Olympics.

References

1946 births
Living people
Cuban male fencers
Olympic fencers of Cuba
Fencers at the 1968 Summer Olympics
Sportspeople from Havana
Pan American Games medalists in fencing
Pan American Games bronze medalists for Cuba
Fencers at the 1971 Pan American Games
20th-century Cuban people
21st-century Cuban people